Lauriya Araraj, also Lauriya Areraj, is a location name in the East Champaran District of the State of Bihar in India.

It is known for the presence of one of the Pillars of Ashoka. The pillar capital is missing, but the pillar bear six Edicts of Ashoka.

Despite the similarity of the names, it is located at a distance of 55 km to the southeast of the other Ashoka pillar at Lauriya Nandangarh.

References

Monumental columns in India
Indian inscriptions
History of Bihar
Edicts of Ashoka
Archaeological sites in Bihar